Missile X – Geheimauftrag Neutronenbombe (English: Missile X: The Neutron Bomb Incident; also known in the United States as The Tehran Incident) is a 1979 Eurospy adventure film directed by Leslie H. Martinson, and starring Peter Graves and Curd Jürgens. An international co-production between West Germany, Italy and Spain, much of filming took place on location in and around Tehran, Iran, in 1978 before the Iranian Revolution overthrew Iran's Shah.

Plot

The story concerns an experimental nuclear cruise missile which is stolen from a Soviet military site in the USSR. An international terrorist group, under the command of a European power-crazed man known only as the Baron is responsible. The Baron plots to use the stolen Soviet missile to destroy an international peace conference in one week located on an island in the Persian Gulf. When the U.S. consul to Iran is murdered by the Baron's henchmen, Alec Franklin, a US intelligence agent, is ordered to travel to Iran to take over as consul as well as investigate the murder. Upon arrival in Tehran, Alec is followed by two of the Baron's henchmen who attempt to kill him, but Alec manages to escape.

Alec then travels from Tehran to Abadan where he meets Konstanine, a Soviet KGB intelligence agent who is in Iran searching for leads to locate the missing cruise missile, which leads to Alec and Konstantine joining forces along with Galina, another Soviet agent, and Leila, an undercover Iranian policewoman, to investigate the Baron in order to find the location to where the cruise missile is being kept before it is used to start World War III.

Cast

Peter Graves as Alec Franklin
Curd Jürgens as The Baron
Karin Schubert as Galina Fedorovna
Michael Dante as Konstanine Senyonov
Carmen Cervera as Nina
Pouri Baneai as Leila
Robert Avard Miller as Stetson
Michael Tietz as Tony
Mel Novak as Mendosa
John Carradine as Professor Nikolaeff 
Aldo Sambrell as George
Frank Braña as Rigo

Commentary track

On June 2, 2017, RiffTrax released as a VOD an edited 84-minute version of the film with a comedic commentary track by Michael J. Nelson, Kevin Murphy, and Bill Corbett.

References

External links

1979 films
1970s spy thriller films
Films directed by Leslie H. Martinson
Cold War spy films
Films about nuclear war and weapons
Films set in Iran
Films shot in Tehran
West German films
Italian spy thriller films
German spy thriller films
Spanish spy thriller films
Films about World War III
Films set in the Soviet Union
Films about assassinations
English-language German films
English-language Italian films
English-language Spanish films
1970s Italian films
1970s German films